Carlos José Barisio (3 January 1951 – 5 February 2020) was a professional goalkeeper, born in San Fernando, Buenos Aires. He retired from football in 1987, after amassing 271 appearances in the Argentinian Primera.

His greatest achievement came as a Ferro Carril Oeste player in 1981, when he set the Primera record for the longest period without letting in a goal. He went 1,075 minutes without conceding, this consisted of 10 complete games and 2 partial games.

In 1982, he was the goalkeeper when Ferro Carril Oeste became only the second team after San Lorenzo to win the Primera without losing a single game.

Titles

References

Argentine footballers
Club Atlético River Plate footballers
Boca Juniors footballers
Club de Gimnasia y Esgrima La Plata footballers
All Boys footballers
Ferro Carril Oeste footballers
Chacarita Juniors footballers
Belgrano de Parana footballers
Argentine Primera División players
2020 deaths
1951 births
People from San Fernando de la Buena Vista
Association football goalkeepers
Sportspeople from Buenos Aires Province